Bantian railway station is a railway station in Bantian Subdistrict, Longgang District, Shenzhen, Guangdong, China. It is an intermediate stop on the Pinghu–Nanshan railway.

History
The station opened to freight in 1993 and to passengers in 1994. Passenger service was suspended on 28 December 2013.

Services
In 2012 there were three northbound departures and no southbound departures.

References 

Railway stations in Guangdong
Railway stations in China opened in 1993